CAPD may refer to:
 China Association for Promoting Democracy
 CAPD library (Computer Assisted Proofs in Dynamics), a software library
 Central auditory processing disorder, a group of disorders impairing the processing of auditory information
 Continuous ambulatory peritoneal dialysis, a form of artificial kidney dialysis